Rhodeus spinalis is a subtropical freshwater and brackish water fish belonging to the Acheilognathinae subfamily of the  family Cyprinidae.  It originates on Hainan Island and the Xijiang River basin in China, and may be native to portions of Vietnam. The fish reaches a length up to 10.0 cm (3.9 in).  When spawning, the females deposit their eggs inside bivalves, where they hatch and the young remain until they can swim.

References 

spinalis
Fish described in 1926